Tirkan or Tirekan or Tirakan or Tir Kan may refer to:
 Tir Kan, Mazandaran (تيركان - Tīr Kān)
 Tirkan, Mazandaran (تيركن - Tīrkan)